The 1998 Prix de l'Arc de Triomphe was a horse race held at Longchamp on Sunday 4 October 1998. It was the 77th running of the Prix de l'Arc de Triomphe.

The winner was Sagamix, a three-year-old colt trained in France by André Fabre. The winning jockey was Olivier Peslier.

Race details
 Sponsor: no sponsor
 Purse: 7,000,000 F; First prize: 4,000,000 F
 Going: Soft
 Distance: 2,400 metres
 Number of runners: 14
 Winner's time: 2m 34.5s

Full result

 Abbreviations: hd = head; nk = neck

Winner's details
Further details of the winner, Sagamix.
 Sex: Colt
 Foaled: 15 March 1995
 Country: France
 Sire: Linamix; Dam: Saganeca (Sagace)
 Owner / Breeder: Jean-Luc Lagardère

References

External links
 Colour Chart – Arc 1998

Prix de l'Arc de Triomphe
 1998
Prix de l'Arc de Triomphe
Prix de l'Arc de Triomphe
Prix de l'Arc de Triomphe